Mongkol Tossakrai (born May 9, 1987), simply known as Yen, is a Thai professional footballer who plays as a winger.

He is considered one of the top 5 players in Matchday 13 of the Thai League 1 in an article by FOX Sports Asia.

Club career

He played for Krung Thai Bank in the 2008 AFC Champions League group stages.

International career

In 2013 Mongkol was called up to the national team by Surachai Jaturapattarapong to the 2015 AFC Asian Cup qualification.
In October, 2013 he debuted for Thailand in a friendly match against Bahrain, as a substitute. On October 15, 2013 Mongkol came in as a substitute against Iran in the 2015 AFC Asian Cup qualification. He scored his first international goal against Kuwait in November 2013. On November 9, 2014 Mongkol scored in a friendly match against Philippines. Mongkol was part of Thailand's winning squad at the 2014 AFF Suzuki Cup. He scored Thailand's first goal of the tournament in the 8th minute a 2-1 victory over hosts Singapore. Although that was the only goal he would score in the completion he was noted for his exiting play on the wings, especially in the second leg of the semi-finals against the Philippines where he constantly threatened the opponent's defense.
In May 2015, he was called up to Thailand to play in the 2018 FIFA World Cup qualification (AFC) against Vietnam.

International

International goals
''As of match played 5 October 2017. Thailand score listed first, score column indicates score after each Tossakrai goal.

Style of Play
Known for his stamina, work-rate, direct running and movement off the ball. Despite his lack of technical proficiency on the ball, his style of play often results in his appearance on the scoresheet. Some of them are crucial goals for his club and country.

Honours

International
Thailand
 ASEAN Football Championship (2): 2014, 2016
Thailand
 King's Cup (2): 2016, 2017

Club
Muangthong United
 Thailand Champions Cup (1): 2017
Chiangrai United
 Thailand Champions Cup (1): 2018
Uthai Thani
Thai League 3 (1): 2021–22
Thai League 3 Northern Region (1): 2021–22

Individual
 Thai League 1 Player of the Month (1): May 2014

References

External links

 

1987 births
Living people
Mongkol Tossakrai
Mongkol Tossakrai
Association football wingers
Mongkol Tossakrai
Mongkol Tossakrai
Mongkol Tossakrai
Mongkol Tossakrai
Mongkol Tossakrai
Mongkol Tossakrai
Mongkol Tossakrai
Mongkol Tossakrai